Theddlethorpe St Helen or East Theddlethorpe is a village and civil parish in the East Lindsey district of the county of Lincolnshire, England. Some seashore belongs to Saltfleetby-Theddlethorpe Dunes National Nature Reserve, consisting of sea dunes and saltwater and freshwater marshes. It is one of five UK locations where the natterjack toad is found. In 2011 the parish had a population of 525. The parish touches Gayton le Marsh, Mablethorpe and Sutton, Theddlethorpe All Saints and Withern with Stain. Theddlethorpe St Helen shares a parish council with Theddlethorpe All Saints.

The Theddlethorpe Gas Terminal processed natural gas from the North Sea until it closed in 2018.

History
In the Domesday Book of 1086, Theddlethorpe appears as Tedlagestorp, believed to mean "outlying farmstead or hamlet of a man called Theodlac".

It had a population according to the 2001 census of 595, reducing to 525 at the 2011 Census.

The parish church is a Grade II* listed building dedicated to St Helen, dating from the 14th–15th centuries. The chancel and aisles were rebuilt by Samuel Sanders Teulon in 1866. The church is of greenstone and limestone, with a 15th-century tower, a 14th-century font, and a 19th–20th-century interior.

Landmarks
There are four listed buildings in Theddlethorpe St Helen. Theddlethorpe St Helen has a church called St Helen's.

Theddlethorpe Hall is a Grade II listed red-brick country house from the late 17th century, with early 18th and 19th-century alterations. The Stable Block is also Grade II listed and dates from the 19th century.

Education
Theddlethorpe St Helen has a primary school.

Former station
Theddlethorpe railway station was on the Louth and East Coast Railway. It opened in 1877 and closed in 1960.

Geography

References

External links
Parish council
Theddlethorpe Dunes NNR
JNNC site
Theddlethorpe Primary School

Villages in Lincolnshire
Populated coastal places in Lincolnshire
Civil parishes in Lincolnshire
East Lindsey District